Rizal is a province of the Philippines.

Rizal may also refer to:
 José Rizal, Filipino national hero whom the province is named after

People
 Akmal Rizal Ahmad Rakhli, Malaysian footballer
 Atep Rizal, Indonesian footballer
 Mohd Rizal Tisin, Malaysian trackcyclist
 Paciano Rizal, Filipino general and revolutionary
 Rizal Barellano, Filipino darts player
 Rizal Fahmi Rosid, Malaysian footballer
 Rizal Nurdin, Indonesian general and politician
 Rizal Ramli, Indonesian politician

Education
 José Rizal University, a private university in the Philippines
 Jose Rizal Memorial State University, a state university in the Philippines
 Rizal Technological University, a public university in the Philippines
 University of Rizal System,  a college system in the Philippines

Geography

Philippines

Municipalities
 Rizal, Cagayan
 Rizal, Kalinga
 Rizal, Laguna
 Rizal, Nueva Ecija
 Rizal, Occidental Mindoro
 Rizal, Palawan
 Rizal, Zamboanga del Norte

Other places
 Rizal, Viga, a barangays in Catanduanes province
 Rizal Avenue, a street in Manila
 Rizal Library, a library in the Ateneo de Manila University
 Rizal Memorial Sports Complex, a stadium in Manila
 Rizal Park, an historical park in Manila
 J. P. Rizal Avenue, a street in Makati, Metro Manila

Outside the Philippines
 Rizal Park (Seattle), a park in the United States

Ships
 Rizal-class corvette, a class of Philippine Navy corvettes
 BRP Rizal (PS-74), the lead ship of the Rizal-class corvettes of the Philippine Navy
 SS Rizal (1896), a cargo ship which was sunk by a German submarine in World War I
 USS Rizal (DD-174), a Wickes-class destroyer in the United States Navy

Other uses
 Rizal (crater), a crater on Mars
 Rizal (film), a 1998 Filipino film

See also
 Rizal Shrine (disambiguation)
 
 Rizla, a brand of tobacco rolling paper